Flavio Barros Souza (born 23 January 1978) is a Brazilian former football striker.

Flávio previously played for Flamengo in Campeonato Brasileiro Série A, Barcelona in Serie A de Ecuador and Necaxa in the Primera División de México.

Honours 
Nacional
 Primera División: 2000

Flamengo
 Campeonato Carioca: 2004

References

1978 births
Living people
Association football forwards
Brazilian expatriate footballers
Expatriate footballers in Ecuador
Expatriate footballers in Uruguay
Expatriate footballers in Mexico
Expatriate footballers in Spain
Expatriate footballers in Hong Kong
Expatriate footballers in Greece
Expatriate footballers in Morocco
Campeonato Brasileiro Série A players
Campeonato Brasileiro Série C players
Liga MX players
Hong Kong First Division League players
Segunda División players
Ecuadorian Serie A players
CR Vasco da Gama players
Campo Grande Atlético Clube players
Barcelona S.C. footballers
Club Nacional de Football players
Club Necaxa footballers
CR Flamengo footballers
Racing de Ferrol footballers
America Football Club (RJ) players
Vila Nova Futebol Clube players
South China AA players
Ethnikos Piraeus F.C. players
Clube Recreativo e Atlético Catalano players
América Futebol Clube (PE) players
Ceres Futebol Clube players
Araguaína Futebol e Regatas players
4 de Julho Esporte Clube players
Associação Esportiva e Recreativa Santo Ângelo players
Footballers from Rio de Janeiro (city)
Brazilian footballers